George Mills Harper (born November 5, 1914, in Linn Creek, Missouri - died on January 29, 2006, in Tallahassee, Florida) was an American academic, a WW2 U.S. Navy officer and professor emeritus of English literature. Harper is remembered today, mainly, as a literary scholar of the Irish poet and mystic, W.B. Yeats, who was a Nobel laureate in literature (1923). He is known for his prolific publications and authoritative books about Yeats's lifelong occult activity and interests, which began and developed early in his poetical career. Harper was also, for a much lesser extent, an academic scholar of the Neoplatonism of William Blake.

Military service
Living in Chapel Hill, NC, Harper joined the U.S. Navy on May 4, 1942, and was assigned to Frontier Base Mayport, FL. During World War II, he served as executive officer of the Receiving Station, Naval Supply Depot, and Naval Detachment in Oran, Algeria, and commanding officer of the Naval Detachment, Naples, Italy. Harper was released from Active Duty on October 3, 1946. He remained in the U.S. Naval Reserve until retirement. During his reserve career, Harper served as Commanding Officer, Naval Reserve Surface Battalion 6-9, Sixth Naval District, Durham, North Carolina. He moved to Tallahassee, FL in 1970. He retired from the U.S. Naval Reserve on November 5, 1974.

Academic career
Harper received his Ph.D. in English in 1951 from the University of North Carolina. He was also a Robert O. Lawton Distinguished Professor of English at Florida State University. He previously served as professor and dean of the College of Arts and Sciences at Virginia Tech and chairman of the English departments at the University of Florida and the University of North Carolina at Chapel Hill. He was an author and editor of 12 books, primarily concerning the Irish poet William Butler Yeats. Among his many published books about W.B. Yeats, were Yeats's Golden Dawn, W.B.Yeats and W.T. Horton, Yeats and the Occult (as an editor). Further publications were: A Critical Edition of Yeats's A Vision (1925) (editor with W.K. Hood), and The Making of Yeats's A Vision and Yeats's Vision Papers books series. He received an Honorary Doctorate of Letters from Trinity College, Dublin, Ireland, for his contributions to Yeats' studies.

In regard to the contributions to the scholarship of William Blake, Harper wrote and published his book, The Neoplatonism of William Blake. Another contribution to the Neoplatonism studies was his collaboration with Kathleen Raine in writing the book Thomas Taylor the Platonist: Selected Writings.

Select bibliography
 Harper, George Mills, editor of Yeats and the Occult, published by the Macmillan Press, xviii + 322 pp, 1976 .  In Yeats Studies Series, edited by O'Driscoll, Robert and Reynolds, Lorna, General Editors. 
 Harper, George Mills, The Neoplatonism of William Blake, published by The University of North Carolina Press, xvi + 324 pp, 1961

References

1914 births
2006 deaths
W. B. Yeats scholars
William Blake scholars
University of Florida faculty
United States Navy personnel of World War II
University of North Carolina at Chapel Hill alumni
Florida State University faculty
University of North Carolina faculty